GS9 is a  hip hop collective based in New York City. Its current members include Bobby Shmurda, Rowdy Rebel, Fetty Luciano, Corey Finesse, and Lil Skrap 1090.

Background

Rowdy Rebel grew up in a neighbourhood known as "the 90s" in Brooklyn's East Flatbush area. People in his 
neighborhood referred to him as "rowdy" as a child, which is the genesis for his stage name. Many members of GS9 (including Shmurda) originated in the same East Flatbush locale. He is of Jamaican and Bajan descent.

Much of Rowdy Rebel's music contains references to the block where he grew up. Rowdy has noted that he and other GS9 members talk about friends from the neighborhood "to keep their names alive." Despite the fact that only he and Bobby Shmurda have been signed to Epic Records, one of their primary goals is to help other GS9 members such as Abillyon and Corey Finesse get record contracts too.

Bobby Shmurda had run-ins with the law while living in Brooklyn, including fifteen months spent in detention for probation violation and being arrested on gun charges that were later dropped. According to his 2014 indictment, Shmurda was the ringleader of a criminal enterprise called "GS9" that regularly entered into disputes with criminal gangs, was responsible for murders and non-fatal shootings, and engaged in drug trafficking along Kings Highway to East Flatbush. All members appeared in Shmurda's video for "Hot Nigga"

On June 3, 2014, Shmurda was arrested and charged with felony criminal possession of a weapon. Police claim they saw him flashing the gun in an apartment and when they went to investigate, he tried to hide it in a couch. He was set free on $10,000 bail. On December 17, 2014, police arrested Shmurda and 14 others, including his brother Javese and his fellow GS9 label-mate Rowdy Rebel. Police charged Shmurda with conspiracy to commit murder, reckless endangerment, and drug and gun possession; charges against the others included murder, attempted murder, assault, and drug dealing.  Shmurda pleaded not guilty and was held on $2 million bail.

Record label
GS9 also release music under GS9 Records. The label is independent and was founded in 2012, however when Shmurda and Rowdy Rebel signed with Epic Records in 2014. Epic went on to distribute for GS9 up until the beginning of 2022 when GS9 ended their distribution partnership with Epic, in favor of self-distributing without the help of Epic or any other record label. GS9’s first release after leaving Epic was Shmurda’s single “They Don’t Know”. The one exclusion is Rebel, as he now has a full deal with Epic Records and Sony Music Entertainment. However, Shmurda no longer has ties with Epic. Shmurda’s last official release under Epic was his song “Shmoney” featuring Quavo and Rebel.

Discography

Mixtapes

References

Hip hop collectives
Hip hop groups from New York City
Musical groups established in 2012
2012 establishments in New York City